Openbucks is an alternative payment gateway founded in 2010 and based in Silicon Valley. It was acquired by payment processor Paysafe Group in July 2020 for an undisclosed amount of money.

Openbucks enables online merchants to accept cash and retailer gift cards as a form of payment from consumers who do not have bank accounts, or credit cards, or prefer to pay cash online to protect their privacy and financial information. Consumers can redeem, like cash, the branded gift cards of major U.S. and Canadian retailers directly at a merchant’s checkout as an alternative to credit card payments. 

With 60,000+ locations in their network, consumers can buy readily available gift cards or present a barcode at the POS to reload an account, making Openbucks the largest and safest alternative cash payment provider in North America. Their partnerships include CVS Pharmacy, Dollar General, and MoneyGram in the U.S., Canada Post in Canada, and Pacific Coffee in Hong Kong. Openbucks services over 2,000 merchants directly such as BigPoint, Plarium, Razer, Wargaming and more, or via payment service providers and aggregators such as Xsolla and Paymentwall, G2APay and more.

History

Foundation 
Openbucks was founded in 2010 by the current CEO, Marc Rochman. The company participated in TechCrunch Disrupt in 2011 to showcase its payment platform.

Awards 
2011 FortyThree Awards  Best Internet Cash Service 

2012 PayBefore Awards  Best in Category Prepaid Gaming Card

2013 Tie50 Award  Silicon Valley Top Startup

2015 Tie50 Award  Silicon Valley Top Startup

References 

Companies based in Silicon Valley